Thomas Shaun Stanage (1932 – 18 March 2020) was bishop of Bloemfontein in the Anglican Church of Southern Africa from 1982 to 1997.

Biography
Stanage was born in Ireland in 1932 and was educated at Pembroke College, Oxford (BA 1956, MA 1960) and Cuddesdon College (1956–58).

He was ordained deacon in 1958, priest in 1959 and bishop in 1978 and went on to serve as an assistant curate of Great Crosby St Faith 1958–61, Minister of Orford St Andrew Conventional District (1961–63) and vicar of St Andrew's  Church, Orford (1963–70).

He has lived and worked in South Africa since 1970. In 1975 he was appointed Dean of Kimberley, remaining in office until 1978 when he was elected suffragan bishop of Johannesburg. He was appointed as the diocesan bishop, holding the see of Bloemfontein from 1982 until his retirement in 1997, Since retiring, he has been a lecturer in theology in the University of the Free State.

He received the degree of Doctor of Divinity honoris causa from Nashotah House in 1986.

Arms
The arms granted to Stanage are blazoned Per chevron ploys, Azure and Argent, the peak ensigned with a fleur-de-lis Or, in dexter chief a horse salient contoumè and in sinister chief a lion rampant, Argent, in base a Celtic cross issuant Gules, voided Argent; the shield ensigned of an episcopal mitre proper.

Sources

Crockford's Clerical Directory (97th edn, London: Church House Publishing, 2001), p. 711
Government Gazette 15805 (24 June 1994), p. 4

References

1932 births
2020 deaths
Irish Anglican theologians
Irish expatriate Protestant bishops
Irish emigrants to the United Kingdom
Alumni of Pembroke College, Oxford
Alumni of Ripon College Cuddesdon
Academic staff of the University of the Free State
20th-century Anglican Church of Southern Africa bishops
Anglican bishops of Bloemfontein
Deans of Kimberley
20th-century Church of England clergy